Boloria polaris, the Polaris fritillary, is a butterfly of the family Nymphalidae. It is found in northernmost Scandinavia, North America (in northeastern Alaska and northern Canada) and in Greenland. It is also found in northeastern Russia. It is one of only six butterfly species found on Canada's Ellesmere Island.

The wingspan is 32–38 mm. A. polaris Bsd. (71e). Similar to the preceding species [ freija, but more variable, the hindwing beneath more variegated, the black median band of the forewing above heavy, deep black, deeply sinuous proximally. In the marginal area regular rows of submarginal spots. The forewing beneath almost as distinctly marked with black as above, but paler. On the hindwing beneath the ground is marked with mother-of-pearl in the
basal area and the narrow band which separates the central from the marginal area bears silvery teeth. —In Norway, Finland, Lapponia, in July and August. The butterfly flies from June to August depending on the location.

The exact food plants are unknown, but in Canada, larvae have been found on Vaccinium uliginosum and Dryas species.

Subspecies 
The following subspecies are recognized:
Boloria polaris erda (central and eastern Siberia)
Boloria polaris kurentzovi (Chukotka Autonomous Okrug and Wrangel island in Siberia)
Boloria polaris polaris (northern Scandinavia, Greenland and North America)

References

External links
Butterflies of Europe
Butterflies and Moths of North America
Butterflies of Canada
Butterflies of Norway

Boloria
Butterflies of Europe
Butterflies of Asia
Butterflies of North America
Insects of the Arctic
Butterflies described in 1828